Andrei Cobeț (born 3 January 1997) is a Moldovan professional footballer who plays as a forward for Slavia Mozyr and the Moldova national team.

Club career
On 28 January 2022, he signed a one-year contract with Belarusian Premier League side Slavia Mozyr. On 20 March 2022, he made his debut for the club in a 3–0 loss against BATE Borisov.

International career
He has represented Moldova at under-17 and under-19 level. On 10 June 2022, he made his senior international debut for the country in a 2022–23 UEFA Nations League D match against Latvia.

Notes

References

External links

1997 births
Living people
Association football forwards
Moldovan footballers
Moldova youth international footballers
Moldova international footballers
Moldovan expatriate footballers
FC Sheriff Tiraspol players
FC Dinamo-Auto Tiraspol players
FC Florești players
FC Slavia Mozyr players
Moldovan Super Liga players
Belarusian Premier League players
Moldovan expatriate sportspeople in Belarus
Expatriate footballers in Belarus